The 1965–66 season was Real Madrid Club de Fútbol's 63rd season in existence and the club's 34th consecutive season in the top flight of Spanish football.

Summary
The club remained at first place almost the entire campaign before was defeated 1–2 by CF Barcelona and lost the title against local rivals Atlético Madrid one round before season finale by just one single point. UD Levante defender Antonio Calpe arrived to enforce the back-up, also, CD Málaga midfielder Manuel Velázquez returned from a two years loan replacing French playmaker Lucien Muller, also, transferred in was defender Pedro de Felipe from Rayo Vallecano benching José Santamaría both arrivals featured a superb season.

Meanwhile, in European Cup the squad clinched its sixth trophy after defeated Inter in Semi-finals and on 11 May 1966 won 2–1 the Final against Abdulah Gegic'  Partizan Belgrade which, previously, in semi-finals eliminated heavily favourites Manchester United without star George Best. Three days after the Final, the Yé-yé team was introduced to the world after 4 players posed for Diario Marca as The Beatles resulting in the nickname from their theme song <<She Loves You>> chorus hit "Yeah-yeah".

In the Copa del Generalísimo, Madrid was eliminated by Real Betis in the quarter-finals 5–4 on aggregate. After seven seasons, 5 League titles and 3 European Cup trophies, Hungarian forward Ferenc Puskás left the club during the summer.

Squad

Transfers

Competitions

La Liga

League table

Position by round

Matches

Copa del Generalísimo

Round of 32

Round of 16

Quarter-finals

European Cup

Preliminary round

Round of 16

Quarter-finals

Semi-finals

Final

Statistics

Players statistics

See also
 Yé-yé (Real Madrid)

References

External links
 BDFútbol

Real Madrid CF seasons
UEFA Champions League-winning seasons
Real Madrid